Rhynchosauroides is an ichnogenus, a form taxon based on footprints. The organism producing the footprints was likely a lepidosaur and may have been a sphenodont, an ancestor of the modern tuatara. The footprint consists of five digits, of which the fifth is shortened and the first highly shortened.

Species

R. beasleyi Nopsca, 1923
R. bornemanni Haubold, 1966
R. brunswickii Ryan and Willard, 1947
R. gangresci da Silva et al., 2012
R. hyperbates Baird, 1957
R. kuletae Baird, 1957
R. majus Demathieu, 1967
R. maximus Gand, 1974
R. minutipes Maidwell, 1914
R. pallinii <small>Conti et al.', 1977</small>R. palmatus Lull, 1942R. petri Demathieu, 1966R. pusillus Haubold, 1966R. rdzaneki Ptaszynski, 2000R. rectipes Beasley, 1911R. retroversipes da Silva et al., 2008R. santanderensis Demathieu and Saiz de Omeñaca, 1977R. schochardti von Lilienstern, 1939R. sphaerodactylus Demathieu, 1971R. tirolicus Abel, 1926R. triangulus Gand, 1977R. virgiliae'' Demathieu et al., 1978

See also 

 List of dinosaur ichnogenera

References 

Reptile trace fossils